Bottineau may refer to:

Pierre Bottineau (1817–1895), a Minnesota frontiersman
Bottineau, North Dakota, U.S.
Bottineau County, North Dakota
Bottineau Municipal Airport
Bottineau, Minneapolis, U.S.
Bottineau LRT
 , an American World War II ship

See also